Ladigarh is a place  from Daltonganj in the Indian state of Jharkhand.

Villages in Palamu district